"Nikita" is a love song by English musician Elton John from his 19th studio album, Ice on Fire (1985). It was released as the album's lead single on 4 October 1985, charting at number three on the UK Singles Chart, peaking at number seven in the United States, and reaching the top 10 worldwide, topping the charts of eight countries. The song features George Michael on backing vocals and Nik Kershaw on guitar.

Song synopsis
In the song, John describes his crush on a person called Nikita, a border guard whom he cannot meet because he is not allowed into the country. Though the name Nikita can refer to women in other languages, it is a male name in Russian. In interviews, John has said that he was aware that Nikita was a male name in Russian.

Composition
The song is composed in the key of G major in 4/4 time. The song employs a verse-chorus-verse format, with the second chorus being shorter than the first, plus a instrumental bridge mechanically-themed breakdown halfway through the second chorus.

Reception
Cash Box said the "tune is as sensitive as the subject matter" and that the song has "a mesmerizing tempo, well textured production and John’s inimitable vocal style."  Billboard called it a "lilting tune."

Music video
The video for the song was directed by Ken Russell. John accepted the proposed script written by Russell which was a male–female love interpretation of the song, depicting his attempted romance of a blonde female East German border guard with short hair. Scenes showed the two together in various happy situations, including wearing the colours of Watford FC, of whom John is a supporter and former chairman. The video also features a red Bentley Continental Convertible, which was owned by John from 1985 to 2000.

Anya Major plays the role of Nikita; Andreas Wisniewski plays a male border guard.

Live performances
John played "Nikita" during the album's tour in 1985 to 1986 and again in the 1988–1989 Reg Strikes Back Tour plus the 1998 leg of The Big Picture Tour. John continued to perform the song in mid-2000s, however the song was only played on his solo concerts ever since.

Allegation of plagiarism
Elton John, Bernie Taupin and Big Pig Music were accused of plagiarism by South African photographer and songwriter Guy Hobbs. Hobbs wrote a song in 1982 entitled "Natasha", about a Russian waitress on a cruise ship, who was never allowed to leave it. The song was copyrighted in 1983, and sent to Big Pig Music (John's publisher) for a possible publishing deal, but Hobbs never heard back from the publisher. In 2001, Hobbs came across the lyric book to "Nikita" and noticed similarities with his song. Despite repeated attempts by Hobbs to contact John over the issue, he never heard from him and so commenced legal action in 2012.

On 31 October 2012, a US federal judge granted John and Taupin's motion to dismiss, finding that the song did not infringe Hobbs' copyright because the only similar elements were generic images and themes that are not protected under copyright law.

Track listings
7-inch single
"Nikita" – 4:54
"The Man Who Never Died" – 5:10
or "Restless" – 4:26
or "I'm Still Standing" – 3:03
or "Don't Let the Sun Go Down on Me" – 6:12

12-inch maxi single
 "Nikita" (album version) – 5:43
 "The Man Who Never Died" – 5:10
 "Sorry Seems to Be the Hardest Word" (live) – 3:26
 "I'm Still Standing" (live) – 4:38

Personnel
 Elton John – Yamaha GS1 piano, synthesizer, lead vocals, backing vocals
 Fred Mandel – synthesizers
 Nik Kershaw – electric guitar, backing vocals
 David Paton – fretless bass
 Dave Mattacks – drums, percussion
 Davey Johnstone – backing vocals 
 George Michael – backing vocals

Charts

Weekly charts

Year-end charts

Certifications

References

External links
http://www.eltonography.com/songs/nikita.html (27 June 2020)

1985 singles
1985 songs
Berlin Wall
Dutch Top 40 number-one singles
Elton John songs
Geffen Records singles
Irish Singles Chart number-one singles
Number-one singles in Belgium
Number-one singles in Germany
Number-one singles in New Zealand
Number-one singles in Portugal
Number-one singles in South Africa
Number-one singles in Switzerland
The Rocket Record Company singles
1980s ballads
Songs involved in plagiarism controversies
Songs with lyrics by Bernie Taupin
Songs with music by Elton John